The Daily Planet was a weekly underground newspaper that was distributed for free on college campuses in the greater Philadelphia area in the 1970s.  It was an early example of an advertiser-funded weekly local entertainment guide. 

The Daily Planet was primarily an arts and entertainment tabloid. providing weekly updates on the counterculture and music scene in the Philadelphia. area.  In one interview, keyboardist Ray Manzarek stated that Christian Culture as a whole was in its own downfall, and that methamphetamines, not psychedelic drugs, was aiding in its demise.

The Daily Planet also contained political coverage on topics such the opposition to the Vietnam war and police brutality. 

Journalist Bob Ingram says this of the Daily Planet: "Campus freebie- These days, every time I look at a daily newspaper’s weekend entertainment, I think of The Daily Planet, which was The Drummer’s entertainment section with a different cover, distributed free to the Greater Philadelphia colleges to grab all that youth market advertising."

References 

 http://www.broadstreetreview.com/index.php/main/article/underground_newspapers_the_first_blogs/
http://www.ebay.com/itm/Philadelphia-Daily-Planet-8-71-Band-Leon-Russell-/310037517400

See also
 Twin Cities Daily Planet
 Berkeley Daily Planet
 Asheville Daily Planet
 Telluride Daily Planet
 Daily Planet DC

Newspapers published in Philadelphia
Weekly newspapers published in the United States